24,25-Dihydroxycholecalciferol, also known as 24,25-dihydroxyvitamin D3 and (24R)-hydroxycalcidiol (abbreviated as 24(R),25-(OH)2D3), is a compound which is closely related to 1,25-dihydroxyvitamin D3, the active form of vitamin D3. Like vitamin D3 itself and calcifediol (25-hydroxyvitamin D3), it is inactive as a hormone both in vitro and in vivo. It was first identified in 1972 in the laboratory of Hector DeLuca and Michael F. Holick.

Formation and significance
24,25-dihydroxyvitamin D3 is formed from 25-hydroxyvitamin D3 by the action of CYP24A1 (25-hydroxyvitamin D3-24-hydroxylase).  CYP24A1 appears to be "a multicatalytic enzyme catalyzing most, if not all, of the reactions in the C-24/C-23 pathway of 25-OH-D3 metabolism."

It has been proposed that 24,25-dihydroxyvitamin D3 is a metabolite of 25-hydroxyvitamin D3 which is destined for excretion.

It is not known whether the compound might also have some physiologically significant activity. Some evidence of a possible receptor has been obtained.

Because 24,25-dihydroxycholecalciferol is considered an inactive metabolite and its significance is that its concentration is expected to decrease in case of mutations inactivating the vitamin D 24-hydroxylase gene.

Interactive pathway map

References

Other articles

 

Secosteroids